Michael Wilfred Miley (March 30, 1953  – January 6, 1977) was a professional baseball player who played two seasons for the California Angels of Major League Baseball. He died in a one-car crash in Baton Rouge, Louisiana.

Miley attended East Jefferson High School in Metairie, Louisiana and played football at Louisiana State University. His exploits and leadership as quarterback for the Tigers earned him the nickname, "Miracle Mike".

Miley quarterbacked LSU into the 1974 Orange Bowl as a junior, but left school to sign with the Angels later that year. 
He was California's No. 1 draft pick in 1974 and played in 70 games in 1975 and 14 in 1976.

See also
 List of baseball players who died during their careers

References

External links

1953 births
1977 deaths
Major League Baseball shortstops
California Angels players
El Paso Diablos players
Salt Lake City Gulls players
LSU Tigers baseball players
LSU Tigers football players
Baseball players from Mississippi
Players of American football from Mississippi
Baseball players from New Orleans
Players of American football from New Orleans
American football quarterbacks
East Jefferson High School alumni
People from Yazoo City, Mississippi
People from Metairie, Louisiana
Road incident deaths in Louisiana